Heidi Henrika Schauman ( Soininen; born 1978) is a Finnish economist, who as of 2021 is the head of research at Danske Bank. Prior to this, she worked as the chief economist at Aktia Bank and Swedbank Finland, as well as in various roles at the Bank of Finland.

In addition to her main professional activities, Schauman has held board positions at the Finnish Cultural Foundation and Finnish National Gallery. She also wrote as a regular columnist for the leading Swedish-language newspaper of Finland, Hufvudstadsbladet, for many years.

Schauman is an alumna of the Hanken School of Economics, where she obtained her PhD in economics, with her doctoral thesis investigating aspects of the labour market.

References

21st-century Finnish economists
Women economists
Hanken School of Economics alumni
1978 births
People from Raseborg
Living people
Swedish-speaking Finns